Lake Saracocha (possibly from Quechua sara maize, qucha lake, lagoon) is a lake in the Cabanillas District, Puno Region, southeastern Peru. Lake Saracocha is located just southeast of Lake Lagunillas.

The lake is home to Orestias pupfish. Rainbow trout have been introduced, which probably played a role in the apparent disappearance of the relatively small local "crawfordi" form of the Titicaca water frog.

See also
List of lakes in Peru

References

INEI, Compendio Estadistica 2007, page 26

Lakes of Peru
Lakes of Puno Region